(New) Hawarden Castle is a house in Hawarden, Flintshire, Wales. It was the estate of the former British prime minister William Gladstone, having previously belonged to the family of his wife, Catherine Glynne. Built in the mid-18th century, it was later enlarged and externally remodelled in the Gothic taste.

History

The core of the present house is formed by a mansion built in 1752–57 for Sir John Glynne, 6th baronet, to the designs of Samuel Turner the elder of Whitchurch, Shropshire. It replaced the 16th century Broadlane Hall, the seat of the Ravenscroft family, which stood some way to the south. Glynne had acquired the estate through marriage. The new house was of brick with stone dressings. The main block was three storeys high, and seven bays wide, with a projecting three-bay central pediment. Two flanking side pavilions were planned but may not have been completed.

In the early 19th century, Sir Stephen Richard Glynne, 8th Baronet inherited the estate. In 1809 to 1810, he had the house enlarged, and the exterior completely remodelled in a crenellated Gothic Revival style, by the London architect Thomas Cundy the elder, although the Georgian interiors were preserved. He died prematurely and Sir Stephen Glynne, the 9th Baronet was left to make further improvements. He was the Lord Lieutenant of Flintshire, Member of Parliament for the Flint Boroughs from 1832 to 1837, and for the County of Flint from 1837 to 1847. In around 1830, he had the main entrance moved from the south side of the house to the north, and had a vaulted porch added. On the death of the 9th Baronet, the estate passed to his brother-in-law, the liberal politician William Gladstone. There were further alterations to the house during Gladstone's occupancy, including a wing housing a library, designed by George Shaw of Saddleworth, built in the mid-1860s, a muniment room for the storage of his papers (1887–88), and an enlarged porch (1889), these last two both by Douglas and Fordham.

In 1896 the Archbishop of Canterbury, Edward White Benson, died at the castle and his body was put on the train at nearby Sandycroft station to be returned to London.

Gladstone occupied the house until his death there in 1898, when it passed to his grandson William Glynne Charles Gladstone (son of W. E. Gladstone's eldest son, William Henry Gladstone, who had been High Sheriff of Flintshire for 1888 but had died in 1891). W. G. C. Gladstone was killed in the First World War. The estate was subsequently purchased by his uncle Henry Gladstone, 1st Baron Gladstone of Hawarden. The house and estate are still a private residence (although some of the grounds are open to the public) and are still owned by the Gladstone family.

In the grounds of the building lie the ruins of a medieval castle, Hawarden Castle. This was built on the site of an Iron Age fort by the Normans and had a round keep built on a motte. Llywelyn ap Gruffudd captured the stronghold in 1265, defeating Robert de Montalt and destroying the castle. De Montalt later reneged on a promise not to rebuild his stronghold and the present massive keep was built. This was besieged in 1281 by Llywelyn's brother, Dafydd. The fatal war of 1282 to 1283 followed, with the Welsh being defeated and Hawarden Castle was occupied by the English after that. During the English Civil War it changed hands several times and ended up in a ruinous state in Parliamentary hands.

The house is designated as a Grade I listed building by Cadw because of its architecture, especially the 18th-century interiors, and for its exceptional importance as the home of W. E. Gladstone. The castle's gardens and landscape park are designated Grade I on the Cadw/ICOMOS Register of Parks and Gardens of Special Historic Interest in Wales.

See also
List of houses and associated buildings by John Douglas
Fasque House – William Gladstone's father's country house

References

External links
 Hawarden Castle on Gathering the Jewels
 Article on Hawarden Castle in House and Heritage, 22 January 2018

Castles in Flintshire
Mock castles in Wales
Houses completed in 1752
Country houses in Wales
Grade I listed buildings in Flintshire
Grade I listed houses
Prime ministerial homes in the United Kingdom
Grade I listed castles in Wales
Registered historic parks and gardens in Flintshire